Pinkerton Run is a  long 1st order tributary to Sewickley Creek in Westmoreland County, Pennsylvania.

Course
Pinkerton Run rises about 0.5 miles west of Madison, Pennsylvania, and then flows south to join Sewickley Creek about 0.5 miles west of Yukon, Pennsylvania.

Watershed
Pinkerton Run drains  of area, receives about 40.2 in/year of precipitation, has a wetness index of 342.05, and is about 34% forested.

References

 
Tributaries of the Ohio River
Rivers of Pennsylvania
Rivers of Westmoreland County, Pennsylvania
Allegheny Plateau